Organellar DNA (oDNA) is DNA contained in organelles (such as mitochondria and chloroplasts), outside the nucleus of Eukaryotic cells.
 Mitochondria contain mitochondrial DNA (mtDNA)
 Plastids (e.g.,  chloroplasts) contain plastid DNA (cpDNA)

Inheritance of organelle DNA 
The traits encoded by this type of DNA, in animals, generally pass from mother to offspring rather than from the father in a process called cytoplasmic inheritance. This is due to the ovum provided from the mother being larger than the male sperm cell, and therefore has more organelles, where the organellar DNA is found.

Although maternal inheritance is most common, there are also paternal and biparental patterns of inheritance that take place. The latter two patterns of inheritance are found most often in plants.

Recombination of organelle DNA is very limited, meaning that any traits that are encoded by the oDNA are likely to remain the same as they are passed from generation to generation.

Structure 
Unlike nuclear DNA, which is present as linear molecules inside the chromosomes, the entire genomes of chloroplasts and mitochondria are present on a single molecule of double-stranded circular DNA molecule; this is very similar structure to a bacterial chromosome.

See also 
 Nuclear DNA
 Non-Mendelian Inheritance

References 

DNA